Roosevelt Estates is an unincorporated community and census-designated place (CDP) in Gila County, Arizona, United States. It is located near the southeast end of Theodore Roosevelt Lake, a reservoir on the Salt River. It was first listed as a CDP prior to the 2020 census.

Demographics

References 

Census-designated places in Gila County, Arizona